Okwuchukwu Francis Ezeh (born 12 September 1997) is a Nigerian professional footballer who plays as a forward for the Turkish club Eyüpspor.

Professional career
Ezeh began his senior career with Balıkesirspor in the TFF First League. After a season and a half with them, he transferred to Adana Demirspor on 10 January 2021. He made his professional debut with Adana Demirspor in a 1–0 Süper Lig loss to Fenerbahçe on 15 August 2021.

References

External links
 

1997 births
Living people
People from Abia State
Nigerian footballers
Association football forwards
Balıkesirspor footballers
Adana Demirspor footballers
Tuzlaspor players
Eyüpspor footballers
Süper Lig players
TFF First League players
Nigerian expatriate footballers
Expatriate footballers in Turkey
Nigerian expatriate sportspeople in Turkey